Ashton Donald "Joe" Yorke (born 7 December 1947) is a New Zealand equestrian. He competed in the individual jumping event at the 1976 Summer Olympics.

References

1947 births
Living people
New Zealand male equestrians
Olympic equestrians of New Zealand
Equestrians at the 1976 Summer Olympics
Sportspeople from Whanganui